Sheikh Kamal International Cricket Stadium is located beside the Madhumati River, Gopalganj, Bangladesh. Various types of sports events of Gopalganj district take place here. This stadium was redeveloped for the 2014 ICC World Twenty20. The stadium has an underground water drainage system, fully roofed gallery, giant screen, trivision side screen, floodlights and beautiful press box.  The stadium complex includes a swimming pool, big gymnasium, separate power station, car parking facility and sports complex for women.

See also
 Stadiums in Bangladesh
 List of cricket grounds in Bangladesh
 Sheikh Fazlul Haque Mani Stadium
 Sheikh Kamal International Stadium, Cox's Bazar

References

Cricket grounds in Bangladesh
1999 establishments in Bangladesh
Sports venues completed in 1999